Svetlana Kuznetsova and Martina Navratilova were the defending champions, but chose not to participate that year.

Shinobu Asagoe and Ai Sugiyama won in the final 6–0, 6–3, against Liezel Huber and Tamarine Tanasugarn.

Seeds
The top four seeds received a bye into the second round.

Draw

Finals

Top half

Bottom half

External links
Draw and Qualifying Draw

Rogers ATandT Cup - Doubles